Yeşilova District is a district of the Burdur Province of Turkey. Its seat is the town of Yeşilova. Its area is 1,108 km2, and its population is 14,773 (2021).

Composition
There is one municipality in Yeşilova District:
 Yeşilova

There are 37 villages in Yeşilova District:

 Akçaköy 
 Alanköy 
 Armutköy 
 Aşağıkırlı 
 Başkuyu 
 Bayındır 
 Bayırbaşı 
 Bedirli 
 Beyköy 
 Büyükyaka 
 Çaltepe 
 Çardak 
 Çeltek 
 Çuvallı 
 Dereköy 
 Doğanbaba 
 Düdenköy 
 Elden 
 Gençali 
 Gökçeyaka 
 Güney
 Harmanlı 
 Horozköy 
 İğdir 
 Işıklar
 Karaatlı
 Karaköy 
 Kavakköy 
 Niyazlar 
 Onacak 
 Örencik 
 Orhanlı 
 Salda
 Sazak 
 Taşpınar 
 Yarışlı 
 Yukarıkırlı

References

Districts of Burdur Province